Piris is a surname. Notable people with the surname include:

Robert Piris Da Motta (born 1994), Paraguayan footballer 
Iván Piris (born 1989), Paraguayan footballer 
Jorge Piris (born 1990), Argentine footballer
Lucas Vera Piris (born 1994), Argentine footballer